Barry Geraghty is an Australian former tennis player.

A tall 198 cm player from Bega, Geraghty made his main draw debut at the Australian Championships in 1962 and took Neale Fraser to five sets in a second round loss. He had an upset win over Davis Cup player Alan Mills at the 1962 British Hardcourts and also had a win over Roger Taylor during his career.

References

External links
 
 

Year of birth missing (living people)
Living people
Australian male tennis players
Tennis people from New South Wales